The Mysterious Stranger is a novel attempted by the American author Mark Twain. He worked on it intermittently from 1897 through 1908. Twain wrote multiple versions of the story; each involves a supernatural character called "Satan" or "No. 44". All the versions remained unfinished (with the exception of the last one, No. 44, the Mysterious Stranger).

Versions 
The three stories differ in length: The Chronicle of Young Satan has about 55,000 words, Schoolhouse Hill 15,300 words and No. 44, the Mysterious Stranger 65,000 words.

"St. Petersburg Fragment" 
Mark Twain wrote the "St. Petersburg Fragment" in September 1897. It was set in the fictional town of St. Petersburg, a name Twain often used for Hannibal, Missouri. Twain then revised this version, removing references to St. Petersburg, and used the text for The Chronicle of Young Satan.

The Chronicle of Young Satan 
The first substantial version is entitled The Chronicle of Young Satan (also referred to as "Eseldorf" version) and relates the adventures of Satan, the sinless nephew of the biblical Satan, in Eseldorf, an Austrian village in the year 1702. Twain wrote this version between November 1897 and September 1900. "Eseldorf" is German for "Assville" or "Donkeytown".

Schoolhouse Hill 
The second substantial text Twain attempted to write is known as Schoolhouse Hill (or "Hannibal") version. It is set in the US and involves the familiar characters Huckleberry Finn and Tom Sawyer and their adventures with Satan, referred to in this version as "No. 44, New Series 864962". Twain began writing it in November 1898 and, like the "St. Petersburg Fragment", set it in the fictional town of St. Petersburg.

No. 44, the Mysterious Stranger 
The third text, called No. 44, the Mysterious Stranger: Being an Ancient Tale Found in a Jug and Freely Translated from the Jug, also known as the "Print Shop" version, returns to Austria, this time in the year 1490, not long after the invention of printing. It tells of No. 44's mysterious appearance at the door of a print shop and his use of heavenly powers to expose the futility of mankind's existence. This version also introduces an idea Twain was toying with at the end of his life involving a duality of the "self", composed of the "Waking Self" and the "Dream Self". Twain explores these ideas through the use of "Duplicates", copies of the print shop workers made by No. 44.
This version contains an actual ending; however, the text still has many flaws and it is debatable whether it can be considered finished.
Twain wrote this version between 1902 and 1908.

Paine-Duneka text of 1916 
The edition published in 1916 (in seven parts in Harper's Magazine, and separately as a book published by Harpers) is composed mainly of a heavily edited Chronicle of Young Satan, with a slightly altered version of the ending from No. 44 tacked on. Albert Bigelow Paine, who had sole possession of Twain's unfinished works after Twain's death and kept them private, claimed that he had searched through Twain's manuscripts and had found the proper intended ending for The Mysterious Stranger. After Paine's death in 1937, Bernard DeVoto became the possessor of Twain's manuscripts and released them to the public. In the 1960s, critics studied the original copies of the story and found that the ending Paine chose for The Mysterious Stranger referred to the characters from different versions of the story (such as No. 44 instead of Satan) and the original names had been crossed out and written over in Paine's handwriting.

In 1963, scholars led by researcher John S. Tuckey carefully examined Twain's papers and manuscripts and discovered that Paine had not only tampered with and patched together three previously unfinished manuscripts but also had with assistance from Frederick Duneka added passages not written by Twain in order to complete The Mysterious Stranger. The book version that was published nonetheless maintains Twain's criticisms of what he believed to be the hypocrisy of conventional religion.

According to editor W. M. Gibson, Paine's volume was a literary fraud that went undetected for more than 40 years. Nevertheless, Gibson also admits that "the cut, cobbled-together, partially falsified text has the power to move and to satisfy esthetically despite its flaws."

Summary 
In 1590, three boys, Theodor, Seppi, and Nikolaus, live relatively happy simple lives in a remote Austrian village called Eseldorf (German for "Assville" or "Donkeytown"). The story is narrated by Theodor, the village organist's son. Other local characters include Father Peter, his niece Marget, and the astrologer.

One day, a handsome teenage boy named Satan appears in the village. He explains that he is an angel and the nephew of the fallen angel whose name he shares. Young Satan performs several magical feats. He claims to be able to foresee the future and informs the group of unfortunate events that will soon befall those they care about. The boys do not believe Satan's claims until one of his predictions comes true. Satan proceeds to describe further tragedies that will befall their friends. The boys beg Satan to intercede. Satan agrees but operates under the technical definition of mercy. For instance, instead of a lingering death due to illness, Satan simply causes one of Theodor's friends to die immediately.

In the village and in other places around the world where Satan transports them magically, the boys witness religious fanaticism, witch trials, burnings, hangings, deaths and mass hysteria. Finally, Satan vanishes with a brief explanation: "[T]here is no God, no universe, no human race, no earthly life, no heaven, no hell. It is all a dream – a grotesque and foolish dream. Nothing exists but you. And you are but a thought – a vagrant thought, a useless thought, a homeless thought, wandering forlorn among the empty eternities!".

University of California Press editions 
In 1969, the University of California Press published, as part of The Mark Twain Papers Series, a scholarly edition of all three unaltered manuscripts, edited by William M. Gibson and titled Mark Twain's Mysterious Stranger Manuscripts; it was republished in 2005. The University of California Press also released a final version of No. 44, The Mysterious Stranger in a popular edition in 1982.

Adaptations

Film versions 
In 1982, a film version of No. 44, The Mysterious Stranger was shot by The Great Amwell Company and shown in the United States on PBS, and later on HBO and was directed by Peter H. Hunt. The role of 44 was played by Lance Kerwin, and August was played by Chris Makepeace.

A scene from The Chronicle of Young Satan was adapted in the 1985 claymation film The Adventures of Mark Twain, wherein Satan invites Tom Sawyer, Huck Finn, and Becky Thatcher to his company, displaying his powers to manifest things at will. He invites them to construct small clay people, which he brings to life and places in a small kingdom. Satan expresses curiosity and eventually spite toward their creations when the clay people display infighting and inflict cruelty on one another. He causes plagues and natural disasters to destroy the small community, buries the ruins with an earthquake, and causes wild vegetation to engulf the spot where the clay people once lived, demonstrating the futility and insignificance of mankind—much to the horror of the children, with Huck Finn uttering "You murdered them!" Satan advises them that "people are of no value" and that more could be made "if we need them". The scene also quotes Satan's last line from the book. In this version, Satan appears playful and friendly when he constructs the small kingdom, slowly revealing himself as cruel and hateful as he destroys it (although he claims he "can do no wrong" since he does not understand the word's meaning). He appears as a robed, headless figure with a mask where his head would be. As his true nature is revealed, the mask gradually changes from a pleasant appearance to a demonic visage and finally a grinning skull. The film also gives a paraphrased line from No. 44, The Mysterious Stranger to Mark Twain as his parting remark to the children: The human race in all its poverty has only one truly effective weapon: Laughter. Against the assault of laughter nothing can stand.

In 1989, a film adaptation of this book was shot in the Soviet Union by Igor Maslennikov and released under the title Filipp Traum (Philipp Traum is the name Satan comes to use amongst humans, Traum being the German word for "dream").

The 2020 acid western movie Day of the Stranger is a loose adaptation of the story in a western setting.

Opera 
Kevin Malone's opera Mysterious 44 is inspired by the work. The première, performed by Manchester Opera Project with a narrated introduction and conclusion by evolutionary biologist Richard Dawkins, was at the residence of the Hallé Orchestra at St Peter's Church, Ancoats, Manchester, on 24 May 2014.

Pop culture  
The DC Comics character Phantom Stranger has many similarities to the Mysterious Stranger. Both characters have vague origin stories which allow the possibility that they are exiled angels.

Artist Ted Richards drew a comic-strip adaptation of "The Mysterious Stranger" for his "Dopin' Dan" character in "Rip-Off Comix No. 1" (Rip-Off Press, San Francisco, 1977).

In the Fallout video game series there is a character known as the "Mysterious Stranger". In the entries Fallout 3 and Fallout: New Vegas he is referred to as a "Guardian Angel", and in Fallout 3, Fallout: New Vegas and Fallout 4 he uses a .44 Magnum.

In the video games Red Dead Redemption and Red Dead Redemption 2, a character known as "The Strange Man" possesses several similarities to the Mysterious Stranger.

See also 
 Mark Twain bibliography

References

External links 
Paine-Duneka text

 
 
 

No. 44, The Mysterious Stranger
  (Not free)

The Mysterious Stranger Manuscripts
  (Google books version; gives access to full text of the book)
  (Not free)
  (Google books version)

Secondary sources
 
 No. 44, The Mysterious Stranger at Encyclopedia.com

1916 American novels
1916 fantasy novels
American fantasy novels
Novels by Mark Twain
Fiction about invisibility
Unfinished novels
Novels published posthumously
Novels set in Austria
Novels set in Missouri
Fiction about shapeshifting
Fiction about the Devil
Novels about dreams
Novels about telepathy
University of California Press books
Harper & Brothers books
American novels adapted into films
Novels adapted into operas